Marbella Cup 2012 is the second edition of the Marbella Cup tournament, the tournament is implement in the Spanish resort of Costa del Sol.
The tournament is held in the period 3 to 9 February 2012 year.

Participants

  FC Krylya Sovetov
  FC CSKA Moscow
  Guangzhou FC
  FC Rubin Kazan
  Lech Poznań
  FC Zestafoni
  FC Timișoara
  FC Dynamo Kyiv

Match

Winners
  (1)  FC Rubin Kazan
 (2)  FC Dynamo Kyiv
 (3)  Lech Poznań

External links
 Official Site
 ScoreSpro
 Oddsportal 2012

2012
2011–12 in Russian football
2011–12 in Polish football
2011–12 in Georgian football
2011–12 in Romanian football
2011–12 in Ukrainian football
2012 in Chinese football